Mark L. Richardson (born March 19, 1952 in Poplar Bluff, Missouri) was a politician who served as Minority Leader in the Missouri House of Representatives.  He also served as an assistant prosecuting attorney and a circuit judge.

His son Todd Richardson has also served as a Republican in the Missouri House of Representatives, and as Speaker of the House from 2015 to 2019.

References

1952 births
Living people
Members of the Missouri House of Representatives
Missouri state court judges
People from Poplar Bluff, Missouri